Cressage is a civil parish in Shropshire, England.  It contains 18 listed buildings that are recorded in the National Heritage List for England.  Of these, one is at Grade II*, the middle of the three grades, and the others are at Grade II, the lowest grade.  The parish contains the village of Cressage and the surrounding countryside.  Most of the listed buildings are timber framed houses, cottages, farmhouses, and farm buildings dating from the 16th and 17th centuries.  The other listed buildings include a former manor house and its stable block, a church, a milepost, a public house, and a war memorial.


Key

Buildings

References

Citations

Sources

Lists of buildings and structures in Shropshire